Iguiniz is a surname. Notable people with the surname include:

Aretz Iguiniz (born 1983), French rugby union player
Emmanuel Iguiniz (1889–1914), French rugby union player